Borcak is a village in the Söğüt District, Bilecik Province, Turkey. Its population is 84 (2021).

Isa Sofi in Borcak is an early Ottoman tomb.

References

Villages in Söğüt District